Burnier is a surname. Notable people with the surname include:

Andreas Burnier (1931–2002), Dutch writer
Gustave Burnier, footballer
Louis Burnier (1795–1873), Swiss Valdensian pastor and writer
Radha Burnier (1923–2013), Indian theosophist
Robert Burnier (1897–1974), French film actor